Fatty and George is an Australian children's sci-fi television series from 1981 produced by the Tasmanian Film Corporation for the Australian Broadcasting Corporation. The series consisted of 10 episodes of 25-minute duration.

The series follows the adventures of a brother and sister as they try to discover the whereabouts of their scientist father, whilst being pursued by an evil woman and her henchman.

Synopsis
Fatty and his sister George are two ordinary kids whose scientist father is experimenting with time travel. One day things go very wrong and he becomes trapped in a limbo-like dimension. Worse still, the rod-like crystal at the heart of his experiment is sought after by the wealthy and evil Nancy, who ruthlessly pursues the siblings in order to possess it. The crystal has the power to freeze time around the bearer, thus the consequences of it falling into the wrong hands could be potentially devastating. With the help of their friend Izzy, aunty Kath and grandad Bert, Fatty and George search for a way to bring their father back, while trying to stay one step ahead of Nancy and her henchman Phil. Complicating matters further are the children's battles with a gang of BMX biker kids, Slasher, Jonsey and Maggot.

Production and distribution
Fatty & George was produced in 1979 and 1980 by the Tasmanian Film Corporation, which had been created by the Tasmanian state government to generate film and television ventures within the state.

Filming took place at various Hobart locations, and on set at the Tasmanian Film Corporation's studios in Moonah.

Fatty & George was screened both nationally on the ABC in 1981, and internationally. Fatty and George was one of Tasmania's most successful exports.

It received several repeat screenings on the ABC in subsequent years. Their rights to screen the series have long since expired, and it is unlikely to see broadcast again.

In 2004 Screen Tasmania presented the first three episodes of Fatty and George in their "Tasmanian Travelling Picture Show".

Home media
Now for the first time this iconic Tasmania production is available on DVD. All ten episodes have been digitally remastered by the Tasmanian Archive & Heritage Office (TAHO).

The popular children's series was selected for release due to requests from the public who were wondering how they could get a copy" says Digital Services’ Officer at TAHO Ron Moss, "There is even a Facebook site for Fatty & George, which doesn’t surprise me; everything old is in vogue again."

John Honey, the director, producer and co-writer of the original series is delighted at its new digital release, "its terrific" he says, "The number of people I speak to who remember Fatty & George is enormous".

Cast

Episode list

External links
 Fatty and George at Bonza RMIT
 Fatty and George at Travelling Picture Show
 Fatty and George at Memorable TV.com
 Fatty and George at Internet Movie Database

Australian children's television series
Australian Broadcasting Corporation original programming
Television shows set in Tasmania
Australian science fiction television series
1981 Australian television series debuts
1981 Australian television series endings
Television series about children